Acronicta americana, the American dagger moth, is a moth of the family Noctuidae. It was originally described by Thaddeus William Harris in 1841 and is native to North America.

Description
The American dagger moth has a wingspan of  It usually has a sharp, double postmedian line, with white in between the two lines. There is a black dash on the anal area of the forewing. The hindwing is gray with a faint, darker gray median line in the male.
The female is similar, except the hindwing is completely dark.

Subspecies
 Acronicta americana americana
 Acronicta americana obscura
 Acronicta americana eldora

Distribution
The American dagger moth is found in North America east of the Rocky Mountains.

Flight period
The American dagger moth can be seen from April to September throughout its range. Caterpillars can be seen from July to October. It has one brood in the north and two to three broods in the south.

Habitat

The American dagger moth is found in deciduous woodlands and forests.

Life cycle
The young caterpillar is densely covered with yellow setae. The older caterpillar's setae are either pale yellow or white. All instars have thin, black setae on the first and third abdominal segments. On the eighth abdominal segment, there is one tuft of black setae. While there are numerous reports of the larval hairs of this species sometimes causing skin irritation in humans, there is no evidence that they possess any form of venom.

Host plants
 Acer – maple species
 Acer negundo – box elder
 Aesculus hippocastanum – horse chestnut
 Alnus – alder species
 Betula – birch species
 Carpinus caroliniana – American hornbeam
 Carya – hickory species
 Castanea – chestnut species
 Cercis – redbud species
 Corylus – hazel species
 Fraxinus – ash species
 Juglans – walnut species
 Platanus – sycamore species
 Populus – poplar species
 Quercus – oak species
 Salix – willow species
 Tilia – basswood species
 Ulmus – elm species

References

Acronicta
Moths described in 1841
Moths of North America